Goodacre is a lunar impact crater. It is located in the rugged southern highlands on the Moon's near side, and is attached to the north-northeastern part of the exterior of Gemma Frisius, a heavily worn and much larger formation. About two crater diameters to the north of Goodacre lies Pontanus.

The crater is named after British selenographer Walter Goodacre.

The outer rim of this crater formation has become eroded by smaller impacts, and is heavily damaged along the southern side. The somewhat distorted satellite crater Goodacre G lies across the co-joined rims of Goodacre and Gemma Frisius. The interior floor has a small central rise and there is a small crater near the northern inner wall. A trace of ray material from Tycho lies along the southwest rim and forms a wispy line that crosses the central peak.

Satellite craters

By convention these features are identified on lunar maps by placing the letter on the side of the crater midpoint that is closest to Goodacre.

References

External links

 

Impact craters on the Moon